This is a list of the ships of the Free French Naval Forces.

Aircraft carriers

Bearn class

Battleships

Bretagne class 
  (obsolete)

Courbet class 
  (obsolete)
  (obsolete) - scuttled during the Battle of Normandy

French-built destroyers

Chacal class
  - lost 27 May 1943

Fantasque class

Bourrasque class 
  - lost 10 June 1944

Escorts leased by the British & Americans

Hunt class
 La Combattante - lost 24 February 1945

Flower class 
  (K58) (ex-HMS Aconite)
  (K100) - lost 9 February 1942
 Commandant d'Estienne d'Orves (K93) (ex-HMS Lotus)
 Commandant Détroyat (K183) (ex-HMS Coriander)
 Commandant Drogou (K195) (ex-HMS Chrysanthemum)
 Lobélia (K05) (ex-HMS Lobelia)
 Mimosa (K11) (ex-HMS Mimosa) - lost 9 June 1942
 Renoncule (K117) (ex-HMS Ranunculus)
  (K57) (ex-HMS Sundew)

Cannon class 
 Algérien  (ex-USS Cronin (DE-107), later Oise)
 Hova (ex-USS Hova (DE-110))
 Marocain (ex-USS Marocain (DE-109))
 Sénégalais (ex-USS Corbesier (DE-106))
 Somali (ex-USS Somali (DE-111))
 Tunisien (ex-USS Crosley (DE-108))

River class 
 Aventure (K263) (ex-HMS Braid)
 Croix de Lorraine (K258) (ex-HMS Strule)
 Découverte (K370) (ex-HMS Windrush)
 Escarmouche (K267) (ex-HMS Frome)
 Surprise (K292) (ex-HMS Torridge)
 Tonkinois (K260) (ex-HMS Moyola)

Submarines

Requin class

Saphir class

Redoutable class



Minerve class

British U class 
  - formerly HMS Vox (P67)

British V class 
  - formerly HMS Vineyard (P84)
  - formerly HMS Vortex (P87)

Avisos

Bougainville class

Minesweepers

Elan class
 
 La Boudeuse
 Commandant Bory
 Commandant Delage
 
 Commandant Duboc
 La Gracieuse 
 La Moqueuse

Patrol vessels
 Poulmic - lost 7 November 1940

Cargo ships 
 Cagou
 Casamance
 Djudjura
 Félix Roussel
 Fort Binger
 Franche-Comté
 Gravelines
 Île-de-Batz
 Indochinois
 Kilissi
 PLM 22

Sailing ships 
 Belle Poule
 Étoile

References 

 LA FLOTTE DE GUERRE DES FNFL